Elektrėnai Ice Palace is an indoor ice hockey arena in Elektrėnai, Lithuania. It seats 2,000 people. It is the home arena of SC Energija. When it was built in 1977, it was the first indoor ice arena in Lithuania.

External links
 Official website

1977 establishments in Lithuania
Indoor ice hockey venues in Lithuania
Buildings and structures in Elektrėnai
Indoor arenas in Lithuania